The 1919 Southern Intercollegiate Athletic Association football season  was the college football games played by the member schools of the Southern Intercollegiate Athletic Association as part of the 1919 college football season. The season began on September 27.

Auburn was widely regarded as the SIAA champion, though Centre was undefeated in all its games. Both claim titles. For defeating Tech and due to charges of professionalism aimed at Centre, as Fuzzy Woodruff recalls "Auburn claimed it. "We defeated Tech" said Auburn. "Yes, but we defeated you" said Vanderbilt. "Yes", said Alabama, "but Tech, Tulane ,and Tennessee took your measure. We defeated Georgia Tech, who tied Tulane, so we are champions...The newspapers, however, more or less generally supported the claim of Auburn..."

Regular season

SIAA teams in bold.

Week One

Week Two

Week Three

Week Four

Week Five

Week Six

Week Seven

Week Eight

Week Nine

Week Ten

Week Eleven

Awards and honors

All-Americans

T – Josh Cody, Vanderbilt (WC-3; DJ-1)
C – Pup Phillips, Georgia Tech (DJ-1)
C – Bum Day, Georgia (DJ-2)

All-Southern team

The following includes the composite All-Southern team posted by H. J. Stegeman, coach at the University of Georgia, for Spalding's Football Guide.

References